Loudspeaker is the sixth studio album by guitarist Marty Friedman, released in 2006 in Japan, and 2007 in United States. It entered the Japanese national chart at #33. This marks the first Top 40 chart position for any of his solo albums.

The album features guest performances of Steve Vai, Kirito, John Petrucci, Jens Johansson, Mick Karn, Masaki, Ryuichi Nishida, and Billy Sheehan.

Track listings

Musicians

Marty Friedman - guitars (all tracks), bass (6,8,9)
Ryuichi Nishida - drums (1,2,3,4,6,10)
Jeremy Colson - drums (5,7,8,11)
Tetsu Mukaiyama - drums (9)
Billy Sheehan - bass (1,4)
Masaki - bass (2,3,5,7)
Mick Karn - bass (10)
Ikuo - bass (11)
John Petrucci - lead guitar (3)
Steve Vai - lead guitar (8)
Jens Johansson - keyboards (6)
Geri Soriano-Lightwood - voice (10)
Ramin Sakurai - manipulation (10)
Tom Harriman - manipulation (10), string arrangement (11)
Track numbers are shown according to "second" pressing

External links
 Loudspeaker Album info from his official English site.
 Loudspeaker Album info from his official Japanese site.
 Loudspeaker Interview

2006 albums
Instrumental albums
Marty Friedman albums